The Immaculate Heart of Mary Cathedralis the cathedral of the Roman Catholic Diocese of Saint Joseph at Irkutsk. It is located at 11 Griboyedov St. in Irkutsk, in the region of Siberia in Russia. It is known for its organ concerts. In 1820 a Roman Catholic parish was founded in Irkutsk, which was then a growing city. Most parishioners were Poles, Lithuanians, or Belarusians, but membership included representatives of many of the Russian Empire's ethnic groups. A wooden church was later dedicated to Our Lady of the Assumption, but burned down during the Great Fire of Irkutsk in 1879. A new Gothic church was consecrated in 1886. The parish was suppressed in Soviet times, during which the priests were arrested and sent to the camps.

After the fall of the Soviet Union the new Russian government permitted religious activities to resume. However, in 1998 the city of Irkutsk declined to return what had been church property to local Catholic religious groups, but instead gave them a plot of land on which to build a cathedral, which was consecrated on September 8, 2000.

See also
Roman Catholicism in Russia
Roman Catholic Diocese of Saint Joseph at Irkutsk

References

Belarusian diaspora in Siberia
European diaspora in Siberia
Lithuanian diaspora in Siberia
Polish diaspora in Siberia
Roman Catholic cathedrals in Russia
Buildings and structures in Irkutsk
Roman Catholic churches completed in 2000
20th-century churches in Russia
21st-century Roman Catholic church buildings